Hallie D'Amore (August 13, 1942 – December 14, 2006) was an American make-up artist who was nominated for Forrest Gump at the 1994 Academy Awards for Best Makeup. She shared her nomination with Judith A. Cory and Daniel C. Striepeke.

Death
Hallie D'Amore killed her husband and herself on December 14, 2006.

Selected filmography

Captivity (2007-released posthumously
Wild Hogs (2007-released posthumously)
The Santa Clause 3: The Escape Clause (2006)
The Shaggy Dog (2006)
Christmas with the Kranks (2004)
The Princess Diaries 2: Royal Engagement (2004)
2 Fast 2 Furious (2003)
We Were Soldiers (2002)
The Princess Diaries (2001)
Galaxy Quest (1999)
Apollo 13 (1995)
Forrest Gump (1994)
Bugsy (1991)
Steel Magnolias (1989)

References

External links

1942 births
2006 suicides
People from Harvey, Illinois
American make-up artists
Suicides by firearm in California
Murder–suicides in the United States
Mariticides